Youngsville Middle/High School  is one of four secondary campuses operated in Warren County, Pennsylvania, by the Warren County School District. The Youngsville campus was built in 1905 and had its last major set of renovations and additions in 1985.

The school day begins at 8 AM and ends at 3:14PM.  The school day is broken into seven periods, plus an advisory before 6th period and a two-tiered lunch grouping.  Most students have one period a day where they attend a study hall instead of a course.

There are three computer labs in the building.

Breakfast and lunch service is offered.

Awards 
A three-person team of Youngsville High School seniors won the 2017 Warren County Teen Driving Competition.  The competition challenged the teens to demonstrate their skills and knowledge through a combination of a slow-drive obstacle course, a pre-trip vehicle assessment, as well as written and perception tests.

Athletics
Youngsville participates in PIAA District 10:

Youngsville won the Region Championship in football most recently in 2011, going 10-0 for an undefeated season.  The school's football team was lost in March 2017, when the school district decided to combine the team with that of Warren Area High School.

Clubs
The following is a list of clubs offered at YHS:
 Academic Bowl
 Aquila, Yearbook
 Broadwalk
 Crossroads
 Eagle Eye
 French
 National Honor Society
 SADD
 Science
 Spanish
 Spirit
 Student Council
 Technology Student Association (TSA)
 Tutoring

Vocational education opportunities
Sophomores, Juniors, and Seniors at Youngsville have the opportunity to spend half of each school day at the Warren County Career Center in Warren, where they can learn from one of fourteen career programs, as well as earn advanced placement credits for post-secondary education in some cases.

References

Educational institutions established in 1905
Public high schools in Pennsylvania
Schools in Warren County, Pennsylvania
1905 establishments in Pennsylvania